The 400 metres hurdles is a track and field hurdling event. The event has been on the Olympic athletics programme since 1900 for men and since 1984 for women.

On a standard outdoor track, 400 metres is the length of the inside lane, once around the stadium.  Runners stay in their lanes the entire way after starting out of the blocks and must clear ten hurdles that are evenly spaced around the track.  The hurdles are positioned and weighted so that they fall forward if bumped into with sufficient force, to prevent injury to the runners.  Although there is no longer any penalty for knocking hurdles over, runners prefer to clear them cleanly, as touching them during the race slows runners down.

The current men's and women's world record holders are Karsten Warholm with 45.94 seconds and Sydney McLaughlin with 50.68 seconds. Compared to the 400 metres run, the hurdles race takes the men about three seconds longer and the women four seconds longer (except for Sydney McLaughlin).

The 400 m hurdles was held for both sexes at the inaugural IAAF World Championships in Athletics. The first championship for women came at the 1980 World Championships in Athletics – being held as a one-off due to the lack of a race at the 1980 Summer Olympics.

History

The first awards in a 400 m hurdles race were given in 1860 when a race was held in Oxford, England, over a course of 440 yards (402.336 m).  While running the course, participants had to clear twelve wooden hurdles, over 100 centimetres tall, that had been spaced in even intervals.

To reduce the risk of injury, somewhat more lightweight constructions were introduced in 1895 that runners could push over. However, until 1935 runners were disqualified if they pushed over more than three hurdles in a race and records were only officially accepted if the runner in question had cleared all hurdles clean and left them all standing.

The 400 m hurdles became an Olympic event at the 1900 Summer Olympics in Paris, France. At the same time, the race was standardized; thus, virtually identical races could be held and the finish times compared to one other. As a result, the official distance was fixed to 400 metres, or one lap of the stadium, and the number of hurdles was reduced to ten. The hurdles are now placed on the course with a run-up to the first hurdle of 45 metres, distance between the hurdles of 35 metres each, and home stretch from the last hurdle to finish line of 40 metres.

The first documented 400 m hurdles race for women took place in 1971. The women's race was not run at the Olympics until the 1984 Summer Games in Los Angeles where it was first staged with the first Men's World Champion having been crowned the year before at the inaugural World Athletics Championships. A special edition of the Women's 400m Hurdles took place in the 1980 IAAF World Championships in Athletics in response to the Women's 400m Hurdles not being included at the boycotted 1980 Summer Olympics in Moscow, and Liberty Bell Classic.

Many athletic commentators and officials have often brought up the idea of lifting the height of the women's 400 m hurdles to incorporate a greater requirement of hurdling skill. This is a view held by German athletic coach Norbert Stein, "All this means that the women's hurdles for specialists, who are the target group to be dealt with in this discussion, is considerably depreciated in skill demands when compared to the men's hurdles. It should not be possible in the women's hurdles that the winner is an athlete whose performance in the flat sprint is demonstrably excellent but whose technique of hurdling is only moderate and whose anthropometric characteristics are not optimal. This was the case at the World Championships in Seville and the same problem can often be seen at international and national meetings."

Hurdling technique

In terms of technique and endurance, the 400-metre hurdles is arguably the most demanding event in the sprints and hurdles group. Athletes must be able to run a fast 400-metre flat time, maintain a good hurdling technique, and have a unique awareness of stride pattern between hurdles. Furthermore, athletes must possess anaerobic endurance over the final 150 to 100 metres of the race as, at this point, lactate (the conjugate base of lactic acid) will accumulate in the body from anaerobic glycolysis.

Block start
When preparing to hurdle, the blocks should be set so that the athlete arrives at the first hurdle leading on the desired leg without inserting a stutter step. A stutter step is when the runner has to chop his or her stride down to arrive on the "correct" leg for take off. Throughout the race, any adjustments to stride length stride speed should be made several strides out from the hurdle because a stutter or being too far from the hurdle at takeoff will result in loss of momentum and speed.

Hurdling
At the beginning of the take-off, the knee must be driven toward the hurdle and the foot then extended. The leg position when extended must be stretched out, in a position of a split. The knee should be slightly bent when crossing the hurdle. Unless an athlete's body has great flexibility, the knee must be slightly bent to allow a forward body lean. Unlike the 110m hurdles, a significant forward body lean is not that necessary due to the hurdles being lower. However, the trail leg must be kept bent and short to provide a quick lever action allowing a fast hurdle clearance. The knee should pull through under the armpit and should not be flat across the top of the hurdle.

It is also important that the hurdler does not reach out on the last stride before the hurdle as this will result in a longer bound being made to clear the hurdle. This will also result in a loss of momentum if the foot lands well in front of the center of gravity.

Stride length
Using a left lead leg on the bends allows the hurdler to run closer to the inside of the lane and cover a shorter distance. Additionally, if the left leg is used for the lead, then the athlete's upper body can be leaned to the left, making it easier to bring the trail leg through. Additionally, an athlete hurdling with a right leg lead around the bends must take care that they do not inadvertently trail their foot or toe around the hurdle rather than passing over the top, which would lead to a disqualification from the race. Depending on the height and strength of the athlete, men work toward a stride pattern of 13 to 15 steps between each hurdle, and women work toward a stride pattern of 15 to 17. This does not include the landing step from the previous hurdle. Ed Moses was the first man to keep 13 strides throughout an entire race. Weaker athletes will typically hold a longer step pattern throughout the race so that they do not bound or reach with each step, which also results in a loss of speed. These patterns are ideal because it allows the hurdler to take off from their predominant leg throughout the race without switching legs. However, fatigue from the race will knock athletes off their stride pattern and force runners to switch legs. At an early age, many coaches train their athletes to hurdle with both legs. This is a useful skill to learn since as a runner tires, their stride length may decrease, resulting in the need either to add a stutter stride, or to take a hurdle on the other leg.

Continental Records 
Updated 22 July 2022.

All-time top 25

Men
 Correct as of September 2022.

Women
Correct as of August 2022.

Note: The following athletes have had their associated 400 m hurdles performances annulled due to doping offences:

Milestones

 Men
 First official IAAF world record: 55.0 seconds, Charles Bacon (USA), 1908
 First under 54 seconds: 53.8 seconds, Sten Pettersson (SWE), 1925
 First under 53 seconds: 52.6 seconds, John Gibson (USA), 1927
 First under 52 seconds: 51.7 seconds, Bob Tisdall (IRL), 1932
 First under 51 seconds: 50.6 seconds, Glenn Hardin (USA), 1934
 First under 50 seconds: 49.5 seconds, Glenn Davis (USA), 1956
 First under 49 seconds: 48.8 seconds, Geoff Vanderstock (USA), 1968
 First under 48 seconds: 47.82 seconds, John Akii-Bua (UGA), 1972
 First under 47 seconds: 46.78 seconds, Kevin Young (USA), 1992 
 First under 46 seconds: 45.94 seconds, Karsten Warholm (NOR), 2021
 Women
 First official world record: 56.51 seconds, Krystyna Kacperczyk (POL), 1974
 First under 56 seconds: 55.74 seconds, Tatyana Storozheva (USSR), 1977
 First under 55 seconds: 54.89 seconds, Tatyana Zelentsova (USSR), 1978
 First under 54 seconds: 53.58 seconds, Margarita Ponomaryova (USSR), 1984
 First under 53 seconds: 52.94 seconds, Marina Stepanova (USSR), 1986
 First under 52 seconds: 51.90 seconds, Sydney McLaughlin (United States), 2021
 First under 51 seconds: 50.68 seconds, Sydney McLaughlin (United States), 2022

Most successful athletes
American athlete Glenn Davis had a prodigious start to his hurdling career, running his first race in April 1956 in 54.4 s.  Two months later, he ran a new world record with 49.5 s and later that year he won the 400 m hurdles at the Olympics, and was also the first to repeat that feat in 1960.

In terms of success and longevity in competition, Edwin Moses' record is significant: he won 122 races in a row between 1977 and 1987 plus two gold medals, at the 1976 Summer Olympics in Montréal and the 1984 Summer Olympics in Los Angeles.  He was undefeated for exactly nine years nine months and nine days, from 26 August 1977 until 4 June 1987.  He finished third in the 1988 Olympic final, the last race of his career. He also held the world record for sixteen years from when he first broke it at the Olympics on 25 July 1976 until it was finally broken by Kevin Young at the 1992 Summer Olympics in Barcelona.

 Olympic Games & World Championships victories
 Edwin Moses (USA), Olympic 1976, 1984, World 1983, 1987
 Felix Sanchez (DOM), Olympic 2004, 2012, World 2001, 2003
 Kerron Clement (USA), Olympic 2016, World 2007, 2009
 Sally Gunnell (GBR), Olympic 1992, World 1993
 Kevin Young (USA), Olympic 1992, World 1993
 Derrick Adkins (USA), Olympic 1996, World 1995
 Melaine Walker (JAM), Olympic 2008, World 2009
 Dalilah Muhammad (USA), Olympic 2016, World 2019
 Karsten Warholm (NOR), Olympic 2020, World 2017, 2019
 Sydney McLaughlin (USA) Olympic 2020, World 2022
 Two Olympic victories:
 Glenn Davis (USA), 1956 and 1960
 Edwin Moses (USA), 1976 and 1984 (also bronze in 1988)
 Angelo Taylor (USA), 2000 and 2008
 Félix Sánchez (DOM), 2004 and 2012
 Two World Championships:
 Edwin Moses (USA), 1983 and 1987
 Félix Sánchez (DOM), 2001 and 2003 (won silver in 2007)
 Kerron Clement (USA), 2007 and 2009
 Karsten Warholm (NOR), 2017 and 2019
 Nezha Bidouane (MAR), 1997 and 2001 (won silver in 1999)
 Jana Pittman (AUS), 2003 and 2007
 Zuzana Hejnová (CZE), 2013 and 2015

Olympic medalists

Men

Women

World Championships medalists

Men

Women
 The official World Athletics Championships began in 1983 as the IAAF World Championships in Athletics, but in 1980, the women's 3000 metres and 400 metres hurdles events had a World Championship competition in Sittard, Netherlands. This was due to these events not yet being on the Olympic program (the same had happened in 1976 for the men's 50 km walk).

Season's bests

National records
Updated 25 February 2023.

Men
NR's equal or superior to 48.00:

Women
NR's equal or superior to 53.00:

Notes and references

External links
IAAF list of 400-metres-hurdles records in XML

 
Events in track and field
Summer Olympic disciplines in athletics
Hurdling